Granville Myrick "Buster" Mitchell (February 16, 1906 – March 4, 1964) was a professional American football end in the National Football League. He played seven seasons for the Portsmouth Spartans (1931–1933), the Detroit Lions (1934–1935), the New York Giants (1935–1936), and the Brooklyn Dodgers (1937).

External links

1906 births
1964 deaths
People from Hill County, Texas
Players of American football from Texas
American football tight ends
Portsmouth Spartans players
Detroit Lions players
New York Giants players
Brooklyn Dodgers (NFL) players
Davis & Elkins Senators football players
Wilmington Clippers players